When in Rome may refer to:

  "When in Rome, do as the Romans do", a saying attributed to Ambrose

Film and television
 When in Rome (1952 film), a film starring Van Johnson and Paul Douglas
 When in Rome (2002 film), a direct-to-video film starring Mary-Kate and Ashley Olsen
 When in Rome (2010 film), a comedy film starring Kristen Bell and Josh Duhamel
 BBC Sunday Night Theatre: When in Rome, a 1959 UK television comedy featuring Judy Campbell

Literature
 When in Rome (novel), a Roderick Alleyn mystery by Ngaio Marsh
 Catwoman: When in Rome, a DC Comics miniseries
 "When in Rome", a poem by Mari Evans

Music
 When in Rome (band), a dance trio from England

Albums
 When in Rome (Cliff Richard album), 1965
 When in Rome (When in Rome album), 1988
 When in Rome (Penguin Cafe Orchestra album), 1988
 When in Rome 2007, a live DVD by Genesis

Songs
 "When in Rome (Do the Jerk)", a song by Rocket from the Crypt
 "When in Rome", a song by Billy Joel from Storm Front
 "When in Rome", a song by Mac Miller from GO:OD AM
 "When in Rome", a song by Mudhoney from Piece of Cake
 "When in Rome", a song by Nickel Creek from Why Should the Fire Die?
 "When in Rome", a song by Phil Ochs from Tape from California
 "When in Rome", a song by Supagroup
 "When in Rome", a song by Travis Tritt from My Honky Tonk History
 "When in Rome (I Do as the Romans Do)", a song written by Cy Coleman and Carolyn Leigh, performed by Barbra Streisand on the album People

Other uses
 "When in Rome", a comedy tour by Alex Horne

See also 
 When in Rome, Kill Me, an album by Cud
 When in Rome Do as the Vandals, an album by The Vandals